Rufus is one of the most common of the ancient Roman cognomina.

List of Rufi
 Quintus Marcius Rufus, an officer of Marcus Licinius Crassus during the Third Servile War in 71 BC
 Annius Rufus, Prefect of Judea in 12 AD
 Calvisius Rufus, governor of Britain in the 3rd century AD
 Curtius Rufus, 1st-century Roman politician (possibly the same as Quintus Curtius Rufus) 
 Faenius Rufus (died 65), Roman senator and praefectus annonae, 55–62 AD
 Gaius Asinius Rufus (ca 110 – aft. 136), Roman Senator
 Lucius Passienus Rufus, consul in 4 BC 
 Lucius Varius Rufus, poet of the 1st century BC
 Lucius Vibullius Rufus, 1st- and 2nd-century Greek aristocrat
 Lucius Virginius Rufus, politician and general of the 1st century
 Marcus Caelius Rufus, politician of the 1st century BC
 Marcus Cluvius Rufus, 1st-century consul, senator, governor, and historian 
 Marcus Junius Rufus, 1st-century Roman politician 
 Marcus Minucius Rufus (consul 221 BC)
 Marcus Valerius Messalla Rufus (c. 104/3 - 26 BC), Roman politician, and consul in 53 BC
 Musonius Rufus, Roman Stoic philosopher of the 1st century
 Publius Aelius Vibullius Rufus, 2nd century Greek Aristocrat
 Publius Rutilius Rufus, politician, general and historian of the 2nd century BC
 Publius Sulpicius Rufus, politician and general of the 2nd century BC
 Quintus Minucius Rufus, 2nd- and 3rd-century BC Roman politician and consul 197 BC
 Quintus Pompeius Rufus (consul 88 BC) (died 88 BC), Roman politician
 Quintus Tineius Rufus (consul 127) (c. 90 – aft. 132 AD), Roman politician
 Quintus Tineius Rufus (consul 182), Roman politician
 Quintus Curtius Rufus, historian of the 1st century|1st or 2nd century
 Rufus (consul 457), consul in 457 AD
 Quintus Salvidienus Rufus, 1st-century BC Roman general
 Servius Sulpicius Rufus, orator of the 1st century BC
 Valgius Rufus, poet of the 1st century BC

References

Ancient Roman cognomina
Ancient Roman prosopographical lists